Dastgerd-e Nagerd (also Romanized as Dastgerd-e Nāgerd) is a village in Gowharan Rural District, Gowharan District, Bashagard County, Hormozgan Province, Iran. At the 2006 census, its population was 169, in 44 families.

References 

Populated places in Bashagard County